Count Adam Baworowski (9 August 1913 – 1943) was an Austrian-Polish tennis player.

Biography

Early life and family
Count Adam Baworowski descended from the Polish noble family Baworowski. He was the son of Count Rudolf Baworow-Baworowski (1865-1931) and Austrian Countess Maria Chorinsky von Ledske (1876-1963), the former who was the Chamberlain of Franz Joseph I of Austria and had estates in Lviv and where Adam often spent his childhood years. He had three brothers and three sisters, Emil, Stefan, Rudolf, Matylda, Marya and Franciszka. He went to school in Vienna and as the family spoke German at home Adam was alienated from his Polish roots in the beginning.

He started playing tennis at a very early age and started taking coaching lessons from the Van Dycków brothers. He attended the tennis club at the Prater where he had a chance to meet Georg von Metaxa, his later Davis Cup teammate and friend. In 1927 he had a victory over Henner Henkel at the Youth Games. In 1929 at the age of 13 he already defeated then-Polish champion Maximilian Stolarow. In 1931, he won the Austrian junior tennis championships as well as the international junior championships of Berlin in singles and doubles. He was ranked tenth on the Austrian rankings. The next year he was classified fifth. While in 1934 he climbed to number four on the same list. In 1935 he won the national singles and doubles championships and drew attention with back to back straight victories against famed players Franz Wilhelm Matejka and Hermann Artens to be crowned champion. Subsequently, he rose to the second place after Matejka. Later he became member of the Wiener Park Club.

International tennis career
He was first drafted into the Austrian Davis Cup troupe in 1933 only for the doubles rubber teaming with Herbert Kinzl with whom he reached the doubles finals of the Sheffield tournament later that year. He played again in the Cup in 1936 along with Georg von Metaxa and reached the semifinals of the European zone. He won the Austrian Championships in the same year. He twice won the International Polish Championship of Warsaw in the doubles partnering Pat Hughes in 1933 and Hans Redl in 1937.  He was twice finalist in Budapest in 1935 and 1937. In 1937 he still held the second spot on the Austrian rankings next to von Metaxa.

In 1936 he won the Capri tournament meeting Jacques Jamain in the championship match. He also won the mixed doubles with Toto Zehden. In January 1937 he lost the doubles final in Saint Moritz, playing with von Metaxa, to Frenchmen Christian Boussus and Paul Féret. In March he lost the Nice title to Kho Sin-Kie in straight sets. At the same tournament he reached the double final as well with von Metaxa. In April he clinched the Monegasque Championships by beating Marcel Bernard in a five set match. He also took the doubles title with von Metaxa defeating Daniel Prenn and Vladimir Landau. In March 1938 he was victorious at the Cannes L.T.C. tournament where he eliminated Swedish champion Karl Schroeder. Schroeder took revenge in the doubles final where he teamed up with seasoned player Jacques Brugnon of the Four Musketeers to stop the Baworowski-von Metaxa duo in a five set match.

At the French Championships, Baworowski reached the fourth round in 1937 and 1938. At Wimbledon, he lost his initial match on three occasions (1933, 1936, 1939). After the "Anschluss", the annexation of Austria into Nazi Germany, in March 1938, Baworowski decided to join the Polish Davis Cup team as he didn't want to lose his family's estates in Poland.

Upon arrival in Poland he gave a few interviews, condemning the "Anschluss" and the policy of the Nazi authorities. His statements were widely covered in the Western media. He joined the Legia Warsaw and on 3 May 1938 he participated in a friendly match between Poland and Germany, and a few days later played in a match in a Legia Warsaw-Stockholm meeting. He quickly moved up to second place on the list of Polish Tennis Association right behind Ignacy Tłoczyński. He was victorious again in the doubles at the Katowice tournament partnering Tłoczyński and the duo represented Poland in the Central European Cup and claimed the trophy after beating Yugoslavia and Czechoslovakia.

The last peaceful season in 1939 kicked off well for him. The Ministry of Foreign Affairs sponsored Baworowski French Riviera tour and it paid off well. At Cannes he was only beaten in the final by Yvon Petra. In Juan-les-Pins he proved to be unstoppable and defeated Robert Abdesselam for the title and carried on this streak at Nice through the final against Antoine Gentien. After this great season opener he suffered injury, which affected his Davis Cup tie against Germany and in the French Championships. However he was a doubles semifinalist along with Ignacy Tłoczyński at Roland Garros. Despite his bad shape he still secured the Polish National Doubles championship alongside Tłoczyński.

World War II and death 
At the outbreak of World War II, after returning from Monaco with a silver medal of the 1939 International University Games Baworowski was residing in Paris where his family lived. When he heard about the outbreak of the war he was determined to join the Polish army although his parents begged him to stay. When he arrived to the East Railway Station of Warsaw, the German Luftwaffe was already bombarding the area. The passengers fled from the trains to nearby trenches. Apparently he was successfully enlisted. The next time he met his cousin Eugene Paul Baworowski in the streets of Warsaw in the first days of occupation he was about to get in touch with the Polish Resistance. As the 6 September 1939 decree issued by the Wehrmacht command pursued every Polish citizen who reached the military age to be sent to a POW camp the Gestapo soon arrested and sent him to a camp. Only his ties to the Chorinsky von Ledske noble family and to the former Austrian Tennis Federation saved him from further reprisals.

In 1941, he took part in the German war championships at Braunschweig and reached the final which he lost to Kurt Gies in five sets. He was practising in the Rot-Weiss Tennis Club of Berlin. He further represented Germany in the Danube Cup, which was a wartime substitute for the Central European Cup. Baworowski later joined the German Wehrmacht and was killed in action in the beginning of 1943 during the Battle of Stalingrad. He served as a Hauptmann. On December 21, 1942, when the Luftwaffe evacuated his troops he ceded his place on the last flight to a heavily injured soldier and decided to stay in the trenches with his subordinates. He was hit by the Soviets and died in agony without receiving any medical help.

Playing style
According to Kordian Tarasiewicz contemporary senior Polish tennis Player Baworowski was "[...] was a well established tennis player on the European courts and represented a versatile offensive [style], especially had a well mastered game at the net".

Ancestry

Footnotes

Works cited

Online media

Books

Periodicals

See also
Baworowscy Library
List of Polish noble families with the title of Count

External links
 
 
 

1913 births
1943 deaths
Austrian male tennis players
Polish male tennis players
Tennis players from Vienna
Date of death missing
Polish military personnel of World War II
Polish prisoners of war in World War II
World War II prisoners of war held by Germany
German Army officers of World War II
German Army personnel killed in World War II
Polish military personnel killed in World War II